Larry Powell is a former Republican member of the Kansas Senate, representing the 39th district from 2013 until 2017.  He is a fourth generation Kansan, from Kalvesta, Kansas, and was a member of the Kansas House of Representatives representing the 117th district, from 2001 to 2013.  Powell's identifies as anti-abortion and is an advocate of the Second Amendment.  He is a supporter of local schools, family farms, and opposes tax increases.

He is a Garden City rancher, and is married to Myrna Powell.

Committee membership
Senator Powell serves on the following legislative committees:
 2015 Special Committee on Agriculture and Natural Resources
 Agriculture (Chair)
 Assessment and Taxation
 Clean Power Plan Implementation Study Committee
 Joint Committee on State Building Construction
 Natural Resources (Chair)
 Ways and Means
 Utilities

Major donors
The top 5 donors to Powell's 2008 campaign:
1. Prairie Band Potawatomi Nation 	$750 	
2. Kansas Realtors Association 	$500 	
3. Kansas Chamber of Commerce 	$500 	
4. Koch Industries 	$500 	
5. Kansas Medical Society 	$500

References

External links
 Kansas House - Larry Powell
 Kansas Senate - Larry Powell
 Project Vote Smart profile
 Kansas Votes profile
 Campaign contributions: 2000, 2002, 2004, 2006, 2008

Republican Party Kansas state senators
Republican Party members of the Kansas House of Representatives
Kansas State University alumni
Living people
1939 births
21st-century American politicians